Jim Jiminee were an English indie pop band active in the late 1980s. They released one LP and three EP vinyl records.

History
Jim Jiminee was founded in September 1986, releasing their first EP, Do It on Thursday in 1987 on Cat & Mouse Records. During the next three years, they would release a further LP and two EPs, while playing gigs at various locations throughout England.

They officially disbanded in 1989, where various band members went on to other projects.

In the late 1990s and early 2000s, several full-length CDs were released by Vinyl Japan, featuring re-releases and previously unreleased material, including a full-length album, The Thatcher Years.

After Jim Jiminee
Kevin and Lindsay Jamieson and Nick Hannan went on to form The Deep Season, and later produced and provided backing for Perry Rose's album The Bright Ring of the Day.

Nick Hannan joined his brother Patrick "Patch" Hannan at his production studio, Blah Street Studio. Patch played drums for The Sundays, Star 69, theaudience and Arnold. While there, Nick appeared on numerous albums for a variety of artists, including Arnold, Jack Henderson and Bennet.

Delphi Newman and guitarist Paul Greendale formed the band World Without Tigers in 1998. In 2002, she sang on Mark Flanagan's album The Chosen Few.

Discography
Do it on Thursday (EP) (Cat & Mouse Records, 1987)
Welcome To Hawaii (LP) (Cat & Mouse Records, 1988) (rerelease Vinyl Japan, 1999)
Town & Country Blues (EP) (Beatwax) (rerelease Vinyl Japan, 2000)
I Wanna Work! (EP) (Cat & Mouse Records, 1988)
The EP (EP) (Vinyl Japan, 2000)
The Thatcher Years (LP) (Vinyl Japan, 2001)

References

External links
Jim Jiminee on MySpace
Discography from TweeNet
FAQ

English indie rock groups
British indie pop groups